Pierre Fritz Lueders (born 26 September 1970) is a Canadian Olympic, world and World Cup champion bobsledder who competed from 1990 to 2010. He piloted both two-man and four-man bobsleigh, retiring after the 2010 Winter Olympics. He was named to Canada's Sports Hall of Fame in 2012.

Biography
Lueders grew up in Edmonton and went to Winterburn School for elementary and junior high. He attended Jasper Place High School for grades 10 through 12.

Competitive career
Originally a decathlete, in 1989 he switched to bobsleigh on the advice of a cousin who was a sportswriter in what was then East Germany, who suggested his build was better suited to the latter sport. Beginning as a brakeman and progressing rapidly, he became a pilot by 1991 and in 1992 won the first World Cup race he entered.

A five-time Olympian, Lueders is the most decorated slider in Canadian history. He was the pilot of the Canadian two-man bobsleigh (teamed with Dave MacEachern) that won the gold medal at the 1998 Winter Olympics (shared with the Italian duo of Günther Huber and Antonio Tartaglia). This was only Canada's second-ever medal in bobsleigh, and the first since Vic Emery led his four-man crew to victory in 1964. Lueders and MacEachern ended their partnership shortly after the 1998 Games, with MacEachern attempting to make the transition to competing as a pilot in his own right: Lueders subsequently teamed up with Ken Leblanc and Giulio Zardo. At the 2002 Winter Olympics in Salt Lake City, Lueders placed a disappointing fifth-place finish in two-man, and ninth in four-man, causing him to take the 2002–03 season off in four-man. At the 2006 Winter Olympics in Turin, in the two-man event, he and his brakeman Lascelles Brown won silver despite having to contend with heavy snowfall.

Lueders also won eight medals at the FIBT World Championships with two golds (Two-man: 2004, 2005), four silvers (Two-man: 1995, 1996, 2003; Four-man: 2007), and two bronzes (Four-man: 1999, 2005).

In the Bobsleigh World Cup, Lueders won the combined men's event four times (1993-4, 1994–5, 1997–8, 2005-6), the two-man event a record six times (1993-4, 1994–5, 1996–7, 1997–8, 2002–3, 2005-6), and the four-man event once (1994-5). Pierre Lueders has won 88 career medals in the Bobsleigh World Cup.

Lueders and his brakeman Justin Kripps made the first run down the Whistler Sliding Centre, a facility built for the 2010 Winter Olympics, on 19 December 2007. Turn 7 at the Sliding Centre, "Lueders Loop", is named in his honor after he crashed out his sled during the track's homologation in March 2008, his first crash since the 2001 Goodwill Games.

In 2010, he finished 5th in the two-man bobsleigh race. He finish 5th in the four-man bobsleigh.

Coaching career
Lueders retired after the Vancouver Games and was named as a national bobsleigh team development coach. He left the job in May 2012, saying he wanted a break from the sport after 22 years as an athlete and coach.

However just over a week later Lueders was appointed head coach of the Russian national bobsleigh team that would go on to win two gold medals at the 2014 Sochi Winter Olympics. He left his position as Russia coach in June 2016.

In October 2017 he became caretaker head coach for the Republic of Korea's bobsleigh team ahead of their campaign on home ice at the 2018 Winter Olympics in Pyeongchang. In the four-man bodsleigh event, the Koreans consisting of Won Yun-jong (pilot), Seo Young-woo, Jun Jung-lin and Kim Dong-hyun tied with one of the German teams for the silver medal, the first Olympic medal won by an Asian bobsleigh team.

Personal life
As of 1997, Lueders resides in Calgary, Alberta. Outside of bobsledding, Lueders joined Sotheby's International Realty as an associate in Calgary in January 2017.

Results

World Cup Championships

References

External links
 
 
 
 Bobsleigh two-man Olympic medalists 1932–56 and since 1964
 Bobsleigh two-man world championship medalists since 1931
 Bobsleigh four-man world championship medalists since 1930
 DatabaseOlympics.com profile
 "Gibson, De-La-Hunty, Lueders named Canadian coaches". International Bobsleigh & Skeleton Federation. (1 July 2010 article accessed 2 July 2010.)
 List of combined men's bobsleigh World Cup champions: 1985–2007
 List of four-man bobsleigh World Cup champions since 1985
 List of two-man bobsleigh World Cup champions since 1985

1970 births
Living people
Bobsledders at the 1994 Winter Olympics
Bobsledders at the 1998 Winter Olympics
Bobsledders at the 2002 Winter Olympics
Bobsledders at the 2006 Winter Olympics
Bobsledders at the 2010 Winter Olympics
Canadian male bobsledders
Canadian people of German descent
Canadian sports coaches
Medalists at the 1998 Winter Olympics
Medalists at the 2006 Winter Olympics
Olympic bobsledders of Canada
Olympic gold medalists for Canada
Olympic medalists in bobsleigh
Olympic silver medalists for Canada
Sportspeople from Edmonton